Gabriel Rafael Fuentes Gómez (born 9 February 1997) is a Colombian professional footballer who plays as a left back for Spanish club Real Zaragoza, on loan from Junior.

Honours

Club

Junior
Categoría Primera A: 2018–II
Superliga Colombiana: 2019

References

External links

1997 births
Living people
People from Santa Marta
Colombian footballers
Association football defenders
Categoría Primera A players
Atlético Junior footballers
Real Zaragoza players
Colombia under-20 international footballers
Sportspeople from Magdalena Department
Colombian expatriate footballers
Colombian expatriate sportspeople in Spain
Expatriate footballers in Spain